The Speaker of the Rivers State House of Assembly is the political head of the legislative body in Rivers State, Nigeria. 

Elected by the Members of the House, the speaker's primary responsibility is to preside over the sitting and deliberations of the Assembly. The Speaker also represents the voters of his or her constituency. Since 1979, there have been eight legislative assemblies with nine people holding the office of Speaker.

List of speakers of the Rivers State House of Assembly

See also
Rivers State House of Assembly
Government of Rivers State

References

 
Politics of Rivers State
Lists of Rivers State politicians